Saint Sagar or Sagaris was a martyr of the early Christian church. He was supposedly (but probably not) a disciple of St. Paul; it is known that he was Bishop of Laodicea, Phrygia. He suffered martyrdom during the reign of Emperor Marcus Aurelius. Sagar was quoted by Polycrates because he was a quartodeciman.

His feast day is 6 October.

References

Saints from Roman Anatolia
2nd-century Christian martyrs
2nd-century bishops in Roman Anatolia
175 deaths
Year of birth unknown